Genevieve Orton (born May 13, 1984) is a Canadian sprint kayaker who has competed since the late 2000s. She won a bronze medal in the K-1 4 x 200 m event at the 2009 ICF Canoe Sprint World Championships in Dartmouth. On June 27, 2016 Orton was nominated to Canada's Olympic team.

References

Canoe09.ca profile

1986 births
Canadian female canoeists
Living people
ICF Canoe Sprint World Championships medalists in kayak
Canoeists at the 2016 Summer Olympics
Olympic canoeists of Canada